An online advertising network or ad network is a company that connects advertisers to websites that want to host advertisements. The key function of an ad network is an aggregation of ad supply from publishers and matching it with advertiser's demand. The phrase "ad network" by itself is media-neutral in the sense that there can be a "Television Ad Network" or a "Print Ad Network", but is increasingly used to mean "online ad network" as the effect of aggregation of publisher ad space and sale to advertisers is most commonly seen in the online space. The fundamental difference between traditional media ad networks and online ad networks is that online ad networks use a central ad server to deliver advertisements to consumers, which enables targeting, tracking and reporting of impressions in ways not possible with analog media alternatives.

Overview

The advertising network market is a large and growing market, with Internet advertising revenues expected to grow from $135.42 bn in 2014 to $239.87 bn in 2019.  Digital advertising revenues in the United States alone are set to reach $107.30 bn in 2018 which is an 18.7% increase from 2017 ad spend. This growth will result in many new players in the market and encourage acquisitions of ad networks by larger companies that either enter the market or expand their market presence. Currently, there are hundreds of ad networks worldwide and the landscape changes daily.

The inventory of online advertising space comes in many different forms, including space on the desktop and mobile websites, in RSS feeds, on blogs, in instant messaging applications, mobile apps, adware, e-mails, and on other media. The dominant forms of inventory include third-party content websites, who work with advertising networks for either a share of the ad revenues or a fee, as well as search engines, mobile, and online video resources.

An advertiser can buy a run of network package, or a run of category package within the network. The advertising network serves advertisements from its central ad server, which responds to a site once a page is called. A snippet of code is called from the ad server, that represents the advertising banner.

Large publishers often sell only their remnant inventory through ad networks. Typical numbers range from 10% to 60% of total inventory being remnant and sold through advertising networks.

Smaller publishers often sell all of their inventory through ad networks. One type of ad network, known as a blind network, is such that advertisers place ads, but do not know the exact places where their ads are being placed.

Types
There are several criteria for categorizing advertising networks. In particular, the company's business strategy, as well as the quality of the networks' traffic and volume of inventory can serve as bases for categorization.

Based on business strategy
Online advertising networks can be divided into three groups based on how they work with advertisers and publishers:

 Vertical networks: They represent the publications in their portfolio, with full transparency for the advertiser about where their ads will run. They typically promote high-quality traffic at market prices and are heavily used by brand marketers. The economic model is generally revenue share. Vertical Networks offer ROS (Run-Of-Site) advertising across specific Channels (example: Auto or Travel) or they offer site-wide advertising options, in which case they operate in a similar fashion to Publisher Representation firms.
 Blind networks: These companies offer good pricing to direct marketers in exchange for those marketers relinquishing control over where their ads will run, though some networks offer a "site opt out" method. The network usually runs campaigns as RON or Run-Of-Network. Blind networks achieve their low pricing through large bulk buys of typically remnant inventory combined with conversion optimization and ad targeting technology.
 Targeted networks: Sometimes called "next generation" or "2.0" ad networks, these focus on specific targeting technologies such as behavioral or contextual, that have been built into an ad server. Targeted networks specialize in using consumer clickstream data to enhance the value of the inventory they purchase. Further specialized targeted networks include social graph technologies which attempt to enhance the value of inventory using connections in social networks.

Based on number of clients and traffic quality
Ad networks can also be divided into first-tier and second-tier networks. First-tier advertising networks have a large number of their own advertisers and publishers, they have high quality traffic, and they serve ads and traffic to second-tier networks. Examples of first-tier networks include the major search engines. Second-tier advertising networks may have some of their own advertisers and publishers, but their main source of revenue comes from syndicating ads from other advertising networks.

While it is common for websites to be categorized into tiers, these can be misleading because tier 1 and tier 2 networks might perform differently based on different metrics, such as reach versus impressions.

Mobile and video ad networks
Ad networks often support a wide spectrum of ad formats (e.g. banners, native ads) and platforms (e.g. display, mobile, video). This is true for most ad networks. However, there also are ad networks that focus on particular kinds of inventory and ads:
 Mobile ad networks, focus on the traffic generated via mobile web and mobile apps, and work with the corresponding ad formats.
 Video ad networks serve ads via inventory, associated with online video content.

Video and mobile ad networks can be acquired by larger advertising companies, or operate as standalone entities.

Issues

 Positioning: Most ad networks don't disclose impressions per site. This means that advertisers or media agencies aren't sure where their ads will run. This can be a dangerous proposition if your ad turns up in website that you don't want to be associated with.
 Malware: Some ad networks have been implicated in aiding the distribution of malware due to allowing malicious advertisers to buy inventory across their partner sites without enough scrutiny.
 Price transparency: Let's examine a scenario. An ad network packages display inventory to an agency at say $10 CPM (cost per mille – or cost per thousand impressions). The ad network would then buy a very small portion of the inventory on premium publications at $50 CPM and a large portion of the long tail inventory at $2 CPM. The real eCPM (effective CPM) of the campaign for the ad network is around $2.50, and is far from the agency's claim of premium inventory. The marketer is however appeased with screen grabs of his ads appearing in premium positions, oblivious of the masquerade while the ad network walks away with a big margin.
 Ad relevance: More often than not, the ads were out of relevance with the website content as a fall out of point 1, and also because there weren't intelligent contextual engines built into the ad servers (the server system that churns out the ads) of these ad networks.

Online ad networks and advertising publishers 
Most online ad-network platforms offer website owners and marketers to signup as advertising publishers. Publishers can then display ads shared by the advertising network and the revenue is shared between both the advertising network and publisher. When the beginners could not pass through the minimum criteria for publishing advertisements, ad placement services could ban the publisher for not fulfilling the requirements. Some networks demand strict terms and conditions while there are other ad publishing alternatives some times commissions vary on what sells otherwise user still to earn a good commission when one matches the criteria, the publisher is allowed to display and share ads provided by the platform to earn a good revenue. Getting approved as a publisher to the best advertising platform is a thorough process. Websites with a clean interface, more traffic and engagements are preferred to be selected as ad network publisher by the advertising platforms.

Notable advertising networks

See also
 Ad exchange
 Contextual advertising
 Malvertising
 Online advertising
 View-through rate

References

Online advertising